Thousand Mile Stare is the fifth studio album by British electronic music artist Chicane. An exclusive 'Collectors Edition Box Set' version of the album was released on 12 December 2011 before any regular CD or digital version was announced. The boxed set was made available to preorder by 18 November 2011.  Those who purchased the boxed set had their name included on the back panel of the booklet. The regular version of the album, containing three previously unreleased tracks, was released on 16 April 2012 by Modena.

The album's cover artwork pays homage to Jean Michel Jarre's Les Chants Magnétiques.

Track listings

Standard version

The Collectors Edition Box Set

Charts

References

External links 
 Thousand Mile Stare at Discogs

2012 albums
Chicane (musician) albums